Trifolium ochroleucon, also known as Trifolium ochroleucum or sulphur clover, is a species of clover in the family Fabaceae. It is a perennial and can be found in grassy places, predominantly on clay soils. It is native to Europe, including the British Isles.

Name 
The species name, ochroleucon, is Latin for "yellowish-white", referring to the colour of the flowers.

Distribution
The plant is localised in the British Isles, with the main stronghold of the species being in East Anglia, whilst the species is also present in Lincolnshire, Merseyside and Worcestershire. It is fairly widespread throughout the rest of Western and Central Europe, and it has also been recorded from Iran and North Africa.

References

ochroleucon